There have been several British 21-inch (533 mm) torpedoes used by the Royal Navy since their first development just before the First World War.

Torpedoes of 21 inch calibre were the largest torpedoes in common use in the RN. They were used by surface ships and submarines rather than aircraft, which used smaller 18-inch torpedoes.

Mark I 

Mark II 

The Mark II, chiefly used by destroyers, entered service in 1914. Apart from some older British ships, it was used with the old US (destroyers-for-bases deal) Town-class destroyers provided to the UK during the early part of the Second World War.

The Mark II*, an improved Mark II, was used by battleships and battlecruisers.

Mark IV 

From 1912, used by destroyers and other surface ships and was an important weapon in the first World War.

Mark V 

The Mark V was used by the A and B-class destroyers and, with modification, by the Kent-class heavy cruisers.

Mark VII 

The Mark VII was issued for use on the British heavy cruisers, i.e. cruisers with 8-inch guns. Designed in the mid-1920s the s were built at the same time in the post Washington Naval Treaty period.

The power came from the use of oxygen-enriched air, though torpedo stocks were converted to run on normal air at the start of the Second World War.

Mark VIII 
Specifications:

Mark VIII
 Entered service: 1927
 Weight: 
 Length: 
 Explosive charge:  TNT
 Range and speed:  at 

Early Mark VIII**
 Range and speed:  at 
 Explosive charge:  Torpex

Late Mark VIII**
 Range and speed:  at 
 Explosive charge:  Torpex

The Mark VIII was designed around 1925 and was the first British burner cycle design torpedo. It was used from 1927 on submarines of the O class onwards and motor torpedo boats. The principal World War II version was the improved Mark VIII**, 3,732 being fired by September 1944 (56.4% of the total number). The torpedo is still in service with the Royal Navy albeit in a limited role, and was used by the Royal Norwegian Navy (Coastal Artillery: Kaholmen torpedo battery at Oscarsborg Fortress) until 1993.

The Mark VIII** was used in two particularly notable incidents:

 On 9 February 1945 the Royal Navy submarine HMS Venturer sank the German submarine U-864 with four Mark VIII** torpedoes. This is the only intentional wartime sinking of one submarine by another while both were submerged.
 On 2 May 1982 the Royal Navy submarine  sank the Argentine cruiser  with two Mark VIII** torpedoes during the Falklands War. This is the only sinking of a surface ship by a nuclear-powered submarine in wartime and the second (of three) sinkings of a surface ship by any submarine since the end of World War II.  The other two  sinkings were of the Indian frigate  and the South Korean corvette ROKS Cheonan.

Mark IX 
First appeared in 1930 and was considerably improved by 1939. Used on
Leander and later cruisers, "A" and later destroyer classes.
Also replaced the old Mark VII in some  cruisers during the war.

Mark X 
From 1939, used by submarines, motor torpedo boats and destroyers from other navies such as the Grom-class destroyer.

Mark XI 
Electric battery-powered torpedo with a  TNT warhead. Entering service during the Second World War it was used by destroyers.

Mark 12 
At first codenamed Ferry, then Fancy, the Mark 12 never reached production. From 1952, it had a warhead of  Torpex.

There were accidents during testing caused by the unstable nature of high test peroxide. One such engine explosion, after loading aboard the submarine HMS Sidon, caused enough damage to have the submarine taken permanently out of service.

Mark 12 torpedoes were out of service in 1959 and the programme was cancelled.

Mark 20 Bidder 

Developed under the codename "Bidder", the Mark 20 was a passive-seeker battery-powered torpedo for use by surface ships (the Mark 20E – for "Escort") and submarines (Mark 20S). The E variant was not long in service due to problems with its programming. This led to several of the frigates that were intended to have used them (Rothesay and Whitby classes) never being fitted with torpedo tubes or having them removed.

It was replaced in the submarine service in the 1980s by Tigerfish.

Mark 21 Pentane 
A project for an autonomous active/passive sonar torpedo to be carried by the Short Sturgeon anti-submarine aircraft. It was cancelled after protracted work but the seeker development was used in Tigerfish.

Mark 22 
A wire-guided version of the Mark 20 produced by Vickers Shipbuilding and Engineering (VSEL) as a private venture.

Mark 23 Grog 
A wire-guided version of the Mark 20. Entered service in 1966 although already obsolescent, and did not become fully operational until 1971, serving only as an interim before Tigerfish entered service.

The MK23 was fitted with a  outboard dispenser that contains a control wire to guide the weapon, During 1973, all of the RN torpedoes had to be taken out of service as the control system was failing at extreme range.

After months of investigation, it was discovered that the fault lay in the Guidance Unit made by GEC. A germanium diode in the AGC circuit had been replaced by a silicon diode, following an instruction by RN stores that all germanium diodes had to be replaced by silicon diodes. Unfortunately, the silicon diode's different characteristics caused the automatic gain control circuit to fail. Once the mistake was found, replacing the diode with the original type cured the problem.

Mark 24 Tigerfish 

The first Tigerfish (Mod 0) entered service in 1980. Tigerfish was removed from service in 2004.

There were several models of Tigerfish due to the modifications made to tackle deficiencies.
 Mark 24 Mod 0 Tigerfish
 Mark 24 Mod 1 Tigerfish
 Mark 24(N) Tigerfish
 Mark 24 Mod 2 Tigerfish

Spearfish

See also 
 British 18-inch torpedo
 List of torpedoes

Notes

References 
 
 
 
 https://web.archive.org/web/20100311033414/http://middle-watch.com/Torpedoes.htm

Torpedoes of the United Kingdom